Kwame Sarkodie (born April 27, 1985) is an American former professional soccer player.

Career

College and Amateur
Born in Dayton, Ohio, Sarkodie played college soccer at the University of Cincinnati. While at college Sarkodie also played in the USL Premier Development League for the Indiana Invaders and the Cincinnati Kings.

Professional
Sarkodie signed his first professional contract in 2008, playing for the Cleveland City Stars in the USL Second Division, and helping them to the USL-2 championship. Following the title game, Sarkodie played two games for the Colorado Rapids reserve team, and signed a brief professional contract to play with the team during the playoffs, but he never made a senior appearance for the team and was waived on March 3, 2009.

On March 26, 2009 the Rochester Rhinos announced the signing of Sarkodie to a one-year contract.

Personal life
Sarkodie's parents are from Ghana. He has two younger brothers who also played soccer at the collegiate level: Ofori Sarkodie at Indiana University and Kofi Sarkodie who's with Houston Dynamo.

References

External links
Rochester Rhinos bio
MLS player profile
Colorado Rapids bio
Cincinnati bio

1985 births
Living people
American soccer players
Cincinnati Bearcats men's soccer players
Cincinnati Kings players
Colorado Rapids players
American people of Ghanaian descent
Indiana Invaders players
Rochester New York FC players
University of Cincinnati alumni
USL League Two players
USL First Division players
USL Second Division players
Indoor soccer players
Cleveland City Stars players
United States men's youth international soccer players
Sportspeople from Dayton, Ohio
Association football defenders
Association football midfielders